Artemisia orientalixizangensis is a rare Tibetan species of plants in the sunflower family. It is found only in eastern and southeastern Tibet.

Artemisia orientalixizangensis is a perennial herb up to 40 cm (16 inches) tall. Inflorescence is a tall, narrow, spike-like panicle of small flower heads. The plant grows on slopes and roadsides at mid-elevations in the mountains.

The epithet "orientalixizangensis" is from Latin "orientalis" meaning "eastern" and "Xizang," the Chinese name for Tibet.

References

External links

orientalixizangensis
Flora of Tibet
Plants described in 1990